The following is the standings of the Iran Football's 2nd Division 1976–77 football season.

League standings

See also 
 1976–77 Takht Jamshid Cup

League 2 (Iran) seasons
Iran
2